Athletic Club Omonia Nicosia (ΑΣΟΛ; Athlitikos Sillogos Omonias Lefkosias, ASOL), commonly known as Omonia Nicosia, or simply Omonia ("Harmony"; also transliterated as Omonoia), is a Cypriot professional multi-sport club, established on 4 June 1948 in Nicosia. It is best known for its football department, which has played in the Cypriot First Division since joining the Cyprus Football Association in 1953. On 14 June 2018, the football department of AC Omonia became a professional for-profit football company, and is since known as Omonia FC. 

Omonia is one of Cyprus' most successful football clubs, having won 21 National Championships, 15 cups, and a record of 17 super cups. Omonia has won five doubles and a record of three domestic trebles, and is one of three Cypriot clubs to never have been relegated to the second division. Omonia also holds an outstanding record of 14 championships in two decades (between 1970 and 1989), a record of being either champion or runner-up 14 times in a row in the championship (between 1973 and 1986), and the record of having won the Cypriot Cup four times in a row (between 1980 and 1983).

AC Omonia also operates departments in basketball, volleyball, futsal, cycling, women's football and women's volleyball.

History

Creation and early years (1948–1953) 
On 23 May 1948, the governing board of APOEL football club sent a telegram to the Hellenic Association of Amateur Athletics (Greek: Σ.Ε.Γ.Α.Σ.), with the opportunity of the annual Panhellenic Track and Field Competition. In its telegram, the board stated its wish for what it described as the "communist mutiny" to be ended. Club players considering this action as a specifically political comment on the Greek Civil War distanced themselves from the board and were duly expelled from APOEL. On 4 June 1948, Dr. Mattheos Papapetrou organized a meeting in Nicosia that led to the creation of Omonia. Many players expelled from APOEL were present at the meeting and joined the new club. Along with other left-wing teams such as Nea Salamina, Alki Larnaca and Orfeas Nicosia, Omonia helped create the Cyprus Amateur Football Federation in December 1948. Omonia took part in the CAFF league until 1953, having won four out of five played championships and five out of five played cups. Omonia was then accepted by the Cyprus Football Association to participate in the Cypriot First Division.

Beginnings in the Cypriot First Division (1953–1969)
After joining the Cypriot First Division in 1953, Omonia only placed seventh out of nine teams in the 1953–54 season, barely avoiding relegation. During that decade, the club's best placing came during the 1956–57 season when the club finished in the third position.

The team would make its closest push for the title during the 1959–60 season after finishing second, one point behind Anorthosis Famagusta. The following year, after seven seasons in the First Division, the club would win its first title in 1960–61 season. Omonia, in that season, would score 91 goals in 24 matches on their way to their first ever Cyprus First Division title. Omonia won their second title during the 1965–66 season.

Golden era (1970s–1980s)

Omonia won its first trophies of the decade in 1972, when the club won both the league and the cup. Led by a young Sotiris Kaiafas, Omonia won seven league titles in the 1970s, six of them were consecutive (1974–1979). At the end of the decade, Omonia had a total of nine championship titles and three cups. At the end of the 1979 season, Omonia trailed its arch-rival APOEL by two championships. In 1976, Sotiris Kaiafas would go on and win the European Golden Shoe for his single-season 39-goal performance. In 2003, he was awarded the UEFA Jubilee Awards for the Best Cypriot Footballer of the 20th century.

The 1980s was a successful decade for the club as it won an additional seven Cypriot League Championship titles including another five consecutive in 1981, 1982, 1983, 1984, 1985, and in 1987 and in 1989. As the 1980s came to an end, Omonia had won 14 Cypriot championship titles, becoming the most successful team on the island at the time.

General decline (1990s)
The 1990s would prove to be less successful than the previous two decades. During this time, Omonia only mustered one Cypriot League title during the 1992–93 season. It would be eight years before Omonia would see its next title. In 1997, Omonia signed the German Rainer Rauffmann, who would later become the second top goalscorer ever for the club. With the help of other Omonia great and then captain, Costas Malekkos, and a young Costas Kaiafas (the son of Sotiris Kaiafas), Rauffmann would become top scorer of the Cypriot First Division in 1997–98, 1998–99, 1999–00 and 2000–01 seasons and led Omonia to two titles.

Revival (2000s)
After a disappointing eight seasons, the 2000s decade began with a trophy. Omonia celebrated its 18th Cypriot league championship title in 2001. Now captained by Costas Kaiafas, Omonia would win its 19th Cypriot League Championship again in 2003. Since 2003, however, the team would stumble and be without a title for the next several years. After numerous seasons of poor signings and underachieving, Omonia's reigns would be taken over by new chairman and team president, Miltiadis Neophytou in 2008.

The team would soon be put back on track starting in 2006, beginning with the signing of Cyprus international goalkeeper Antonis Georgallides. Omonia would continue its star-studded signings by acquiring Cypriot stars that had been playing abroad, such as Elias Charalambous and Stathis Aloneftis. Omonia would then make headlines with the shocking signing of all-time leading scorer for Cyprus, Michalis Konstantinou. In 2009, Omonia would also sign another Cypriot star, Konstantinos Makrides. En route, Omonia would also acquire young Cypriot hopefuls, 21-year-old Dimitris Christofi and 20-year-old Georgios Efrem. Efrem, who had been playing on the youth team of Arsenal and later Scottish side Rangers, would be the final piece to the puzzle needed to win its 20th Cypriot league championship. After putting the proper pieces in place, Omonia did just that. During the 2009–10 season, led by the new captain, Elias Charalambous, Omonia would not lose a single derby, including play-off matches against APOEL, Anorthosis and Apollon.

Head coach Takis Lemonis left the club after disappointing results and Dušan Bajević became the new coach in October 2010, but was fired in April 2011. He was replaced by Neophytos Larkou. Omonia would not be able to repeat as Champion during the 2010–11 regular season, and instead had to settle with finishing second, despite the addition of yet another young Cypriot rising star, Andreas Avraam. The club, however, was able to finish the season on a positive note: under interim coach Neophytos Larkou, Omonia defeated Apollon Limassol in the Cypriot Cup final to win their 13th cup title.

Omonia spent a difficult year but won their 14th cup starring André Alves, who scored the winning goal against AEL Limassol in the final. Under the guidance of newly appointed director of football Nickolas Danskalou, Omonia finished second in the Championship and third after the playoff rounds, all but assuring they would qualify for the second round of the 2012–13 UEFA Europa League.

Financial crisis (2012–2018)
Head coach Neophytos Larkou left the club in September 2012 and Toni Savevski was then appointed as coach. The team began the season with a great win but found its second success after several games. A disappointing first round proved enough to exclude the club from contesting for the championship or the cup. The team managed better results in the second round, finishing the season in third place. Thousands of fans answered the president's call to donate as much as they could and the financial issues of the club improved. Omonia was knocked out in the semi-finals of the cup by AEL Limassol.

In 2013, Omonia began the new season with Savevski as manager, but he was sacked halfway beside positive results. Miguel Ángel Lotina was hired as the replacer, but was sacked just 37 days later. Kostas Kaiafas, ex-player was then appointed as the new coach. The club's financial difficulties returned despite the massive fundraiser organized the previous season. Omonia finished fifth in the league, making it its worst season in 56 years.

In August 2014, Omonia was knocked out of the Europa League by Dynamo Moscow, in the play-off round. The club issued a complaint to UEFA regarding the refereeing of the match by Alexandru Tudor. In early September, the club stopped supplying the fans' group Gate 9 with tickets resulting in the group's abstention from matches. Two weeks later, after a meeting between the president and the coach, it was decided that tickets were to be supplied again to Gate 9. Omonia finished fourth in the league. The team was eliminated from the Cypriot Cup in the semi-finals by APOEL.

The team ended the 2015–16 campaign in 4th place. During this season, Omonia reached the final of the Cypriot Cup but lost to Apollon Limassol. The 2016–17 season saw the club finish 5th. This meant that for the first time in 15 years the club had failed to qualify for European football. Following a general assembly at the end of the season, Antonis Tzionis was elected as the new club president. While the 2017–18 campaign began with high expectations, Omonia finished the season in 6th place. This season was the worst in the club's history, in terms of defeats and goals conceded. Despite this, the club sold a total of 95,222 tickets during the season, more than any other team in the league.

Papastavrou era (2018–present)
The decline of the club's football department and the financial difficulties it faced convinced many that a change in the way the club was being run was needed. In May 2018, a general assembly was called and members voted to hand the football department over to Stavros Papastavrou, an American-based Cypriot businessman. Papastavrou plans to invest 5 million euros into the club over the next few years and will invest more over the 20-year period that he will be in charge. He has stated that he will provide funds for the development of the club's academies and training grounds, and that the potential creation of a new stadium will be considered.

In the club's first season under Papastavrou's ownership, Omonia finished the 2018–19 campaign in 6th place and was knocked out of the Cypriot Cup by Apollon Limassol in the second round. Manager Yannis Anastasiou was replaced by Henning Berg in June 2019. 

The 2019–20 Cypriot season was abandoned in March 2020 due to the COVID-19 pandemic. At the time of its abandonment, Omonia was tied with Anorthosis Famagusta on points, but was ranked first due to a better head-to-head record and thus qualified for the first qualifying round of the 2020–21 UEFA Champions League.

The following season, Omonia eliminated Red Star Belgrade in the Champions League to qualify for the group stage of a European Competition for the first time in the club's history. Omonia finished fourth in Group E of the 2020-21 Europa League. In the home game against PSV Eindhoven, Omonia captain Jordi Gómez scored from a distance of 56 metres, breaking the record for the furthest distance ever for a goal scored in the Europa League. In May 2021, Omonia ended the season by winning the Cypriot League for the 21st time, and for the first time since 2010.

Omonia started the 2021-22 season by winning the Super Cup, and qualifying for the group stage of the Europa Conference League. However, a disastrous first half of the league campaign saw Omonia out of the Championship Playoffs, meaning they would place below 6th for the first time since the 1953–54 season. Heavy criticism led to head coach Henning Berg being released, and subsequently replaced by Neil Lennon on 7 March. Lennon was able to improve the team's form, and led Omonia to win the 2021–22 Cypriot Cup, their first since 2012, beating Ethnikos Achna 5-4 on penalties, and guaranteeing a place in the 2022–23 Europa League Play-off round, where they would go on to beat Belgian cup winners Gent to qualify for the group stages.

Name 
"Omonia" (Ομόνοια) is the Greek language word for harmony, unity, or concord.

Colours and badge
Omonia's club colours are green and white. The green color indicates hope while white indicates happiness

Omonia's badge has a green shamrock in a white circle. 

Omonia tends to use a red alternative kit.

Stadium

Following the creation of the club, Omonia used the Goal Stadium from 1948 to 1953. After joining the Cyprus Football Association, Omonia moved to the old GSP Stadium in 1953, and then to the Makario Stadium in 1978, where they played until 1999.

Since 23 October 1999, Omonia has been using the 22,859-seat New GSP Stadium, the largest stadium in Cyprus. They share and rent the stadium with local rival APOEL.

Kit manufacturers and shirt sponsors

Supporters

Historically, Omonia has been one of the most popular teams in Cyprus since the creation of the club. A 2022 study conducted by the University of Nicosia found Omonia to be the most popular team on the island by far, with 30.7% of the approximately 1500 contestants stating they support the club.

Omonia holds the record for the most league tickets sold by a Cypriot team in a single season (162,061 during the 2009–10 campaign). The club also holds the Cypriot record for the highest average attendance in a season (11,003 during the 2003–04 campaign).

Omonia supporters are known for their left-leaning, socialist character, with many stating that they associate themselves with the Progressive Party of Working People. Omonia is also traditionally regarded as the club of "the people" and Cyprus' working class. Many of Omonia's supporters can be seen waving banners bearing Che Guevara's image.

Financial crisis and 2013 Pan-Cypriot fundraiser
By the end of February 2013, Omonia was struggling to meet the UEFA criteria due to the economic crisis that had engulfed the club. The club's president then decided to start a fundraiser and called for the supporters of the club to donate as much as they could. Hundreds of events were organised island wide with the motto; "ΕΙΜΑΙ ΟΜΟΝΟΙΑ ΔΗΛΩΝΩ ΠΑΡΩΝ" meaning, "I'M WITH OMONIA, I DECLARE MYSELF PRESENT. " Current and former players contributed by signing autographs and selling club merchandise. Although the situation at the beginning was described as grim, money poured in from all over the island and from abroad including England and the United States. In about a month and a half, €3.5 million was collected from the club's supporters.

Gate 9 
The team's ultras group, Gate 9, was established in 1992. The group would occupy the GSP Stadium's north stand during Omonia's home games. Gate 9 has established relations with other left wing supporters such as those of Hapoel Tel Aviv and Standard Liège.

On 29 May 2018, the club agreed to turn its football department into a for-profit company, under the ownership of Stavros Papastavrou. Gate 9 had previously condemned the idea and published several statements criticising it. On the same day, Gate 9 declared they would no longer support the team, and announced they would create their own football club, which would "respect the principles and history of Omonia". People's Athletic Club Omonia 29M was founded on 23 July 2018 and currently plays in the Cypriot Second Division.

Honours
 Cypriot Championship
 Winners (21): 1960–61, 1965–66, 1971–72, 1973–74, 1974–75, 1975–76, 1976–77, 1977–78, 1978–79, 1980–81, 1981–82, 1982–83, 1983–84, 1984–85, 1986–87, 1988–89, 1992–93, 2000–01, 2002–03, 2009–10, 2020–21

 Cypriot Cup
 Winners (15): 1964–65, 1971–72, 1973–74, 1979–80, 1980–81, 1981–82, 1982–83, 1987–88, 1990–91, 1993–94, 1999–2000, 2004–05, 2010–11, 2011–12, 2021–22

 Cypriot Super Cup
 Winners (17) (record): 1966, 1979, 1980, 1981, 1982, 1983, 1987, 1988, 1989, 1991, 1994, 2001, 2003, 2005, 2010, 2012, 2021

 CAFF Championship
 Winners (4) (record): 1948–49, 1949–50, 1950–51, 1951–52

 CAFF Cup
 Winners (5) (record): 1948–49, 1949–50, 1950–51, 1951–52, 1952–53

Player records

Record in European competitions

European Cup / UEFA Champions League

European Cup Winners' Cup

UEFA Cup / UEFA Europa League

UEFA Europa Conference League

Players

Current squad

Out on loan

Former players
For details of former players, see :Category:AC Omonia players

Retired number

12 – The club's supporters (the 12th man)

Staff

Technical staff

Staff

Source: omonoiafc.com.cy

Management

AC Omonia

Source:

Omonia FC

Source: omonoiafc.com.cy

Managerial history 

  Dikran Missirian (1948–52)
  John Johnson (1952–53)
  Pambos Avraamides (1953–55)
  Hans Hungehuisen (1955–57)
  Karl Vogler (1957–59)
  Eli Fuchs (1959–60)
  Nako Chakmakov (1960–62)
  András Turay (1962–63)
  Stoyan Petrov (1963–64)
  Andreas Keremezos (1964–65)
  Georgi Pachedzhiev (1965–66), first term
  Igor Netto (1966–67)
  Georgi Berkov (1967–68)
  Georgi Pachedzhiev (1968–70), second term
  Khrustyo Chakarov (1970–71)
  Dobromir Tashkov (1971–72), first term
  Vasil Spasov (1972–74), first term
  Andreas Constantinou (Esso) 1974–75
  Tzvetan Ilchev (1975–76)
  Gavril "Gatso" Stoyanov (1976–77)
  Petar Argirov (1977–79)
  Yoncho Arsov (1979–80), first term
  Vasil Spasov (1980–82), second term
  Dobromir Tashkov (1982–83), second term
  Atanas Dramov (1983–85)
  Yanko Dinkov (1985–86)
  Yoncho Arsov (1986–89), second term
  Bozhil Kolev (1989–90)
  Helmut Senekowitsch (1990–91)
  Graziano Zakarel (1991–92)
  Yoncho Arsov (1992–94), third term
  Gerhard Prokop (1994–96)
  Walter Skocik (1995–96)
  Angel Kolev (1996–97)
  Andreas Michaelides (1997–99)
  Dušan Galis (1999)
  Yoncho Arsov (1999–00), fourth term
  Asparuh Nikodimov (2000)
  Arie Haan (14 November 2000 – 30 November 2000)
  Henk Houwaart (1 October 2000 – 30 November 2001), first term
  Andreas Mouskallis (2002)
  Toni Savevski (2002–04), first term
  Franciszek Smuda (2004)
  Henk Houwaart (1 July 2004 – 21 December 2005), second term
  Ioan Andone (28 December 2005 – 25 May 2007)
  Dragan Okuka (23 May 2007 – 26 November 2007)
  Ioannis Matzourakis (2007)
  Giorgos Savvidis (2007–2008)
  Nedim Tutić (2008–09)
  Takis Lemonis (17 March 2009 – 4 October 2010)
  Dušan Bajević (13 October 2010 – 14 April 2011)
  Neophytos Larkou (15 April 2011 – 18 September 2012)
  Toni Savevski (26 September 2012–18 December 2013), second term
  Miguel Ángel Lotina (1 January 2014 – 6 February 2014)
  Kostas Kaiafas (12 March 2014 – 2 November 2015)
  Vladan Milojević (11 November 2015 – 18 May 2016)
  John Carver (4 June 2016 – 23 February 2017)
  Akis Ioakim (23 February 2017 – 26 May 2017)
  Pambos Christodoulou (26 May 2017 – 5 December 2017)
  Ivaylo Petev (14 December 2017 – 21 March 2018)
  Juan Carlos Oliva (17 June 2018 – 22 October 2018)
  Yannis Anastasiou (1 November 2018 – 21 May 2019)
  Henning Berg (6 June 2019 – 28 February 2022)
  Neil Lennon (7 March 2022 – 18 October 2022)
  Yannick Ferrera (23 October 2022 – 6 February 2023)
  Sofronis Avgousti (6 February 2023 – Present)

Source: Trifylli

Presidential history
Here is the list of the previous presidents of Omonia:

References

External links

 Official website 
 Omonia Lefkosias National Football Teams

 
Football clubs in Cyprus
Association football clubs established in 1948
1948 establishments in Cyprus
Football clubs in Nicosia
Multi-sport clubs in Cyprus
Unrelegated association football clubs